Augustus George Rivers (b. November 19, 1909 - d. October 15, 1985) was a Canadian ice hockey forward.

Born in Winnipeg, Manitoba under the name Gustave Desrivieres, Rivers played his entire National Hockey League career with the Montreal Canadiens.  It started in 1929. He would retire after the 1932 season.  He went on to win two Stanley Cups with Montreal in 1930 and 1931.

Awards and achievements
Stanley Cup Championships (1930 & 1931)
"Honoured Member" of the Manitoba Hockey Hall of Fame

References

External links

Gus Rivers's biography at Manitoba Hockey Hall of Fame

1909 births
1985 deaths
Canadian ice hockey forwards
Elmwood Maple Leafs players
Elmwood Millionaires players
Montreal Canadiens players
Manitoba Bisons ice hockey players
Ice hockey people from Winnipeg
Stanley Cup champions
Winnipeg Hockey Club players